Sportpark Noord was a multi-use stadium in Heerenveen, Netherlands.  It was used mostly for football matches and hosted the home matches of SC Heerenveen. The stadium was able to hold 15,000 spectators at its peak.  It was closed in 1994 when the Abe Lenstra Stadion was opened.

External links
Stadium information

Defunct football venues in the Netherlands
Sports venues in Heerenveen
SC Heerenveen
Sports venues completed in 1928